Chabrier is a French surname. Notable people with the surname include:

Albert Chabrier (1896–1920), French World War I flying ace
Carole Chabrier, French-Monagesque television host
Emmanuel Chabrier (1841–1894), French musician
Gilles Chabrier, French physicist and astrophysicist

Surnames of French origin